Dennis F. Abbott (born 1941) is a Democratic member of the New Hampshire House of Representatives, representing the Rockingham 12th District since a special election in 2004. He had previously served from 1994 through 2000.

External links
New Hampshire House of Representatives - Dennis Abbott official NH House website
Project Vote Smart - Representative Dennis Abbott (NH) profile
Follow the Money - Dennis Abbott
2006 2004 1998 campaign contributions

Democratic Party members of the New Hampshire House of Representatives
1941 births
Living people
People from Exeter, New Hampshire